WCFC-LP is a Contemporary Christian formatted broadcast radio station licensed to and serving Richmond, Virginia.  WCFC-LP is owned and operated by Crusade For Christ Family Worship Church COGIC.

References

External links
 WCFC-LP Online
 

2008 establishments in Virginia
Radio stations established in 2008
CFC-LP
CFC-LP
Radio stations in Richmond, Virginia